The Stellenbosch Theological Journal (Afrikaans: Stellenbosch Teologiese Joernaal) is a biannual peer-reviewed academic journal covering all aspects of theology. It was established in 1959 as the Dutch Reformed Theological Journal/Die Nederduitse Gereformeerde Teologiese Tydskrif, obtaining its current title in 2015. It is published  by the Department of Systematic Theology of Stellenbosch University.

External links

Publications established in 1959
Biannual journals
Stellenbosch University
Multilingual journals
Religious studies journals
Creative Commons Attribution-licensed journals